Sulevi is a village in Abkhazia, Georgia.

The village was established by Estonians in 19th century. As of 2011, 127 Estonians live there (together with Salme village).

References

Populated places in Gagra District
Estonian diaspora